Henry Richmond Droop (12 September 1832 – 21 March 1884) was an English mathematician. He devised the Droop quota used in the Single Transferable Vote. He also may have been the first to write down what later became known as Duverger's Law, in 1869.

He married Clara Baily (ca. 1841 – 7 September 1921) on 17 August 1872 and was the father of archaeologist John Percival Droop (1882–1963).

References
 https://web.archive.org/web/20110819150834/http://ksimmon.sasktelwebsite.net/PS06/PS06_157.HTM
 Henry R. Droop, On Methods of Electing Representatives, Journal of the Statistical Society of London, Vol. 44, No. 2. (Jun., 1881), pp. 141–202 (Reprinted in Voting matters, No. 24 (Oct., 2007), pp. 7-46)
 William H. Riker Duverger's Law: Forty Years Later. From Grofman and Lijphart Electoral Laws and their political consequences 1986.

1832 births
1884 deaths
19th-century English mathematicians